Soederberghia is a genus of prehistoric lungfish that lived during the late Devonian period.

Soederberghia probably had a widespread range because fossils have been discovered in North America, Greenland and Australia.

The long-snouted Soederberghia shares many relationships with the lungfish Rhynchodipterus.

References 

Prehistoric lungfish genera
Devonian bony fish
Late Devonian animals
Late Devonian fish
Prehistoric fish of Australia
Devonian fish of North America